The Women's Triple Jump at the 2009 World Championships in Athletics will be held at the Olympic Stadium on August 15 and August 17. Cuban Yargelis Savigne had registered nine of the ten farthest jumps pre-championships and was seen as a strong favourite. The twice world gold medallist Tatyana Lebedeva and world-leader Nadezhda Alekhina were also considered possible medallists. The reigning Olympic champion, Françoise Mbango, had failed to perform well in the buildup to the championships and did not start the competition.

In the qualifying rounds, Asian record holder Xie Limei had the biggest jump of the day with 14.62 m, improving on her previous season's best by more than 40 cm. Savigne, Lebedeva, and Mabel Gay were the only other athletes to reach the 14.45 m automatic qualifying mark in what was a largely modest qualifying round.

The jumps in the final of the competition were not of the standard shown in previous years, and favourite Savigne was largely unchallenged. She took the gold with a best of 14.95 m to become only the second athlete to win consecutive world titles in the event (after Lebedeva's 2001 and 2003 double). Second-placed Gay (14.61) won her first ever World Championship medal and Pyatykh reached the podium with a mark of 14.58 m. Biljana Topic set a Serbian record of 14.52 m for fourth place, but no other athletes managed beyond 14.50 m.

Medalists

Records

Qualification standards

Schedule

Results

Qualification
Qualification: Qualifying Performance 14.45 (Q) or at least 12 best performers (q) advance to the final.

Key:  DNS = Did not start, PB = Personal best, Q = qualification by place in heat, q = qualification by overall place, SB = Seasonal best

Final

Key:  NR = National record, SB = Seasonal best

References
General
Triple jump results. IAAF. Retrieved on 2009-08-16.
Specific

Triple jump
Triple jump at the World Athletics Championships
2009 in women's athletics